Rossiteria nucleolus is a species of sea snail, a marine gastropod mollusk in the family Trochidae, the top snails.

Description
The height of the shell attains 5.6 mm, its diameter 6.3 mm. The narrowly umbilicateshell has a depressed globose-conic shape. Its color pattern is white with an interrupted buff zone above, and conspicuously variegated with squarish black-brown spots, of which there is a row of broad ones below the suture (three or four on a whorl), a row of smaller ones just above the periphery, and another one on the base. Besides these, there is an irregular articulation or dotting of dark brown on the spiral cords. The glossy surface is sculptured with numerous very low and subequal, nearly smooth spiral threads, almost obsolete on the base, but reappearing on the border of the umbilicus. The surface shows, under a lens, subregular, close, longitudinal grooves, almost obsolete, but visible  near the suture and umbilicus. The five whorls are convex. The body whorl is well rounded. The aperture is oblique. The columellar margin is deeply concave in the middle. The columella is abruptly truncate at the base. The outer lip is bevelled to a sharp edge, thickened and spirally lirate within.

Distribution
This marine species occurs off Japan and the Philippines.

References

 H. Pilsbry, New Japanese Marine Mollusca:Gastropoda; Proceedings of the Academy of Natural Sciences of Philadelphia. vol. 56 (1904); pl. VI # 58, 58a
 Poppe G.T., Tagaro S.P. & Dekker H. (2006) The Seguenziidae, Chilodontidae, Trochidae, Calliostomatidae and Solariellidae of the Philippine Islands. Visaya Supplement 2: 1-228. page(s): 111

External links
 To Encyclopedia of Life
 To World Register of Marine Species

nucleolus
Gastropods described in 1903